Sound Party is a 2004 Indian Tamil-language drama film directed by Aarthi Kumar. The film stars Sathyaraj and Prathyusha with Vadivelu in a pivotal role. The film, produced by GR, had musical score by Deva and was released after several delays in August 2004 to negative reviews. The film was a remake of Malayalam film Kottaram Veettile Apputtan starring Jayaram.

Plot
Kumaresan (Sathyaraj) is a rich landlord in a village who spends his wealth for the welfare of his village. As Kumaresan's parents passed away when he was young, he has no one to care for except his sidekicks (Vadivelu, Manivannan and Halwa Vasu). Govindan (Ilavarasu) also hails from the same village who has enmity with Kumaresan and keeps interrupting often whenever Kumaresan wants to find a bride. Nandini (Prathuysha) comes from a poor family whose father (GR) is a drunkard. Nandini is good in academics and gets admission into a medical college but has no money for her education. Kumaresan has a soft corner for Nandini and comes for rescue by taking responsibility for her education expenses. Slowly, Kumaresan falls in love with Nandini, but does not disclose it to her. However, Nandini views Kumaresan as her well-wisher. Kumaresan also builds a small hospital in his village and Nandini gets employed there. Nandini's father plans for her to marry Govindan's son. This infuriates Kumaresan, who announces his love for Nandini which shocks her. Nandini replies that she never had any such feelings towards Kumaresan as she always has a huge respect for him but not love. This worries Kumaresan and understands that it was his mistake to take Nandini for granted. Nandini's wedding is arranged with Govindan's son, but Nandini decides to marry Kumaresan in the end as she thinks that is how she can reciprocate for all the help of Kumaresan. In the end, Kumaresan and Nandini are married.

Cast
Sathyaraj as Kumaresan
Prathyusha as Nandini
Vadivelu
Manivannan 
Dhamu
Mayilsamy
Ilavarasu
G. Ramachandran (producer)
Anumohan
Sabitha Anand as Sarasu

Production
The film progressed with shoots in Pollachi taking place in 2001, with producer GR choosing to also essay a role in the film. Prathyusha committed suicide in February 2002 and the film was subsequently delayed. The film remained unsold and unable to gain a distributor for an extended period after time after the venture had been completed. During the delay, Aarthikumar had completed another film Azhagesan again with Sathyaraj.

Soundtrack 
Soundtrack was composed by Deva. The song "Aavani Ponthingal" from the original Malayalam film is retained here as "Kaveri Penne".

Release
The film eventually had a low key release in August 2004, releasing three weeks after another Sathyaraj starrer Sema Ragalai. The film won mixed reviews with a critic noting "With its measly story and laughable characterization, it is likely to be forgotten even faster than his other movies." A critic from The Hindu noted it was "typical fare" and that "it evokes only a lukewarm response because both the hero's characterisation and the storyline are vague throughout."

References

2004 films
Tamil remakes of Malayalam films
Films scored by Deva (composer)
2000s Tamil-language films